Sivan (also Romanized as Sīvān; also known as Sanvan, Senavān, Sevān, Seyyedān, and Suan) is a village in Arzil Rural District, Kharvana District, Varzaqan County, East Azerbaijan Province, Iran. At the 2006 census, its population was 51, in 17 families.

References 

Towns and villages in Varzaqan County